Bust gez dam  (from , in ) also known as  Bast gez dam , is a dam in Kukherd city, southwestern  Kukherd District, Hormozgan Province, Iran.

Geology
Bust gez Valley basin is located in the southern part of Zeer Mountain and southern Dasak Mountain is a beg Mount from Kukherd District in the city of Kukherd in Bastak County (شهرستان بستک) Hormozgan Province. Is a modern dam which was built in 2005 in southern mountain.

References 

Peter Jackson and Lawrence Lockhart (Ed) (1986), Vol. 6th, The Cambridge History of Iran: Cambridge University Press
الكوخردى ، محمد ، بن يوسف، (كُوخِرد حَاضِرَة اِسلامِيةَ عَلي ضِفافِ نَهر مِهران) الطبعة الثالثة ،دبى: سنة 199۷ للميلاد Mohammed Kookherdi (1997) Kookherd, an Islamic civil at Mehran river, third edition: Dubai
محمدیان، کوخری، محمد ، " (به یاد کوخرد) "، ج1. ج2. چاپ اول، دبی: سال انتشار 2003 میلادی Mohammed Kookherdi Mohammadyan (2003), Beyade Kookherd, third edition : Dubai.
محمدیان، کوخردی ، محمد ،  «شهرستان بستک و بخش کوخرد»  ، ج۱. چاپ اول، دبی: سال انتشار ۲۰۰۵ میلادی Mohammed Kookherdi Mohammadyan (2005), Shahrestan Bastak & Bakhshe Kookherd, First edition : Dubai.
عباسی ، قلی، مصطفی،  «بستک وجهانگیریه»، چاپ اول، تهران : ناشر: شرکت انتشارات جهان
سلامى، بستكى، احمد.  (بستک در گذرگاه تاریخ)  ج2 چاپ اول، 1372 خورشيدى
اطلس گیتاشناسی استان‌های ایران [Atlas Gitashenasi Ostanhai Iran] (Gitashenasi Province Atlas of Iran)
محمدیان، کوخری، محمد. (کوخرد سرزمین شاعران)  ج1. چاپ اول، دبی: سال انتشار 200۵ میلادی Mohammed Kookherdi Mohammadyan (2005), Sarzamin Shaaran, First edition : Dubai.

External links 
 Kookherd website

Dams in Hormozgan Province
Reservoirs in Iran
Kukherd District
Dams completed in 2005